Rogelio Manuel Pizarro Domenech (born August 23, 1979) is a retired male track and field athlete, who competed in the sprints events during his career. He represented his native country at the 2000 Summer Olympics, where he was eliminated in the first round of the men's 4x100 metres relay, alongside Jorge Richardson, Osvaldo Nieves and Félix Omar Fernández. Pizarro ran the second leg in the heat 4 race.

Achievements

†: Most probable, but relay team members could not be retrieved.

References
sports-reference

1979 births
Living people
Puerto Rican male sprinters
Athletes (track and field) at the 2000 Summer Olympics
Athletes (track and field) at the 2003 Pan American Games
Olympic track and field athletes of Puerto Rico
Pan American Games competitors for Puerto Rico